Butocarboxim is a carbamate insecticide. It is a structural isomer of aldicarb.

See also
Carbamate insecticide
Aldicarb

References

Carbamate insecticides
Oxime carbamates
Thioethers
Acetylcholinesterase inhibitors